K. Mahendran is an Indian politician and incumbent Member of the Legislative Assembly of Tamil Nadu. He was elected to the Tamil Nadu legislative assembly from Perambur constituency as a Communist Party of India (Marxist) candidate in 2001, and 2006 elections.

References 

Living people
Communist Party of India (Marxist) politicians from Tamil Nadu
Year of birth missing (living people)
Tamil Nadu MLAs 2001–2006
Tamil Nadu MLAs 2006–2011